Stewart Conn (born 1936) is a Scottish poet and playwright, born in Hillhead, Glasgow. His father was a minister at Kelvinside Church but the family moved to Kilmarnock, Ayrshire in 1941 when he was five. During the 1960s and 1970s, he worked for the BBC at their offices off Queen Margaret Drive and moved to Edinburgh in 1977, where until 1992 he was based as BBC Scotland's head of radio drama. He was Edinburgh's first makar or poet laureate in 2002–05.

Works
As well as several collections of poetry, his books include a collection of essays and memoir poems, Distances (2001), from Scottish Cultural Press. Most recently he edited 100 Favourite Scottish Poems (SPL/Luath Press, 2006), a TLS Christmas choice, and 100 Favorite Scottish Love Poems (Luath Press, 2008). He has won three Scottish Arts Council book awards, travel awards from the Society of Authors and the English-Speaking Union, and the Institute of Contemporary Scotland's first Iain Crichton Smith award for services to literature. His collection An Ear to the Ground was a Poetry Book Society Choice, and Stolen Light was shortlisted for Saltire Scottish book of the year. A special issue of Chapman magazine was devoted to the work of Stewart Conn, April 1, 2007. The Breakfast Room won the Scottish Mortgage Investment Trust Book Awards Poetry Book of the Year Prize in 2010.

Poetry includes
Each year links to its corresponding "[year] in poetry" article:
 1967: Thunder in the Air Akros Publications
 1967: The Chinese Tower: A Poem Sequence M. Macdonald
 1968: Stoats in the Sunglight Hutchinson & Co.
 1972: An Ear to the Ground Hutchinson & Co.
 1987: In the Kibble Palace Bloodaxe Books
 1992: The Luncheon of the Boating Party Bloodaxe Books
 1999: Stolen Light: Selected Poems Bloodaxe Books
 2001: Distances: A Personal Evocation of People and Places Scottish Cultural Press
 2005: Ghosts at Cockcrow Bloodaxe Books
 2007  The Loving Cup Mariscat
 2010: The Breakfast Room Bloodaxe Books
 2012  Estuary Mariscat
 2014: The Touch of Time: New and Selected Poems Bloodaxe Books
 2016:  Against the Light Mariscat
 2019: Aspects of Edinburgh Scotland Street Press

Plays include 
 The Burning (1971)
 Clay Bull
 Greenvoe
 Hugh Miller
 Mission Boy
 The Aquarium
 The King
 Thistlewood
 Under the Ice
 Play Donkey
 Herman
 I Didn't Always Live Here

References

Further reading
 Conn, Stewart (2001), Distances: A Personal Evocation of People and Places, Scottish Cultural Press, 
 Lockerbie, Catherine, "Making Waves: Radio in Scotland", in Parker, Geoff (ed.), Cencrastus No. 20, Spring 1985, pp. 8 - 11,

External links
profile at British Council website
Author website
Interview at www.thedarkhorsemagazine.com
Kilmarnock Academy Famous Former Pupils
Biography on Bloodaxe Books website
Encyclopedia Entry
biography at Scottish Poetry Library

1936 births
Living people
People educated at Kilmarnock Academy
Scottish dramatists and playwrights
People from Hillhead